Madelene Olsson (born 14 November 1982) is a Swedish racing cyclist. She competed in the 2013 UCI women's road race in Florence.

References

External links

1982 births
Living people
Swedish female cyclists
Place of birth missing (living people)